Cuthbert Musoko (born 13 May 1994) is a Zimbabwean first-class cricketer. He was part of Zimbabwe's squad for the 2014 ICC Under-19 Cricket World Cup. In December 2020, he was selected to play for the Eagles in the 2020–21 Logan Cup.

References

External links
 

1994 births
Living people
Zimbabwean cricketers
Sportspeople from Harare